The Mexican War Streets, originally known as the "Buena Vista Tract", is a historic district in the Central Northside neighborhood of Pittsburgh, Pennsylvania, in the United States. The district is densely filled with restored row houses, community gardens, and tree-lined streets and alleyways. The area dates to around the time of the Mexican–American War.

Brief history
In the late 19th century, Allegheny, Pennsylvania (later annexed by Pittsburgh), became known for its stately homes, occupied by some of the area's wealthy families. One such area became known as the Mexican War Streets. It developed from land owned by William Robinson Jr., ex-mayor of the city of Allegheny, who subdivided the property into streets and lots in 1847. Surveys for the development were made by Alexander Hays. A number of the streets are named after battles and generals of the Mexican–American War, including Buena Vista Street, Monterey Street, Palo Alto Street, Resaca Place, Sherman Avenue, and Taylor Avenue. Fremont Street (currently Brighton Place) had been named in recognition of John C. Frémont.

Historic District Designation
The  district was listed on the National Register of Historic Places in 1975 with 119 buildings deemed to contribute to the historic character of the district. In 2008, the district's listing was increased to include an additional 288 contributing buildings over a  area. As of 2020, the historic district has been expanded.  The general boundaries of the Mexican War Streets Historic District are Brighton Road to Federal Street (on the east and west) and North Avenue to Jefferson Street (on the south and north). As part of the designation, all exterior alterations to buildings within the Historic District that are visible from a public street or way must be reviewed and approved by the City of Pittsburgh's Historic Review Commission.

Gallery

References

External links

Mexican War Streets Society
Allegheny City Central Association
Pittsburgh City Council description

Houses on the National Register of Historic Places in Pennsylvania
Italianate architecture in Pennsylvania
City of Pittsburgh historic designations
Pittsburgh History & Landmarks Foundation Historic Landmarks
Houses in Pittsburgh
Historic districts on the National Register of Historic Places in Pennsylvania
National Register of Historic Places in Pittsburgh